The Luo language is an unclassified language spoken in a section of the Atta region of Cameroon. It is a critically endangered language, or possibly extinct, with only one speaker remaining in 1995.

References

Languages of Cameroon
Endangered languages of Africa
Unclassified languages of Africa
Endangered unclassified languages